The majority of Pakistani names are derived from Arabic, Persian, and Turkic names. In Pakistan, as in other Muslim countries, the use of family names is not as prominent as in Western countries and most Pakistanis have Arabic, Persian or Turkic names. Tribal, patronymic, nisba, or similar dynastic- or lineage-related, names are also widely used.

Given names 

Children may be given one, two or rarely three names at birth. If the person has more than one given name, one of them is chosen as the person's most called name, by which he is called or referred to informally. Generally for Muslim males, Muhammad, the name of the prophet of Islam, is chosen to be the person's first given name, if he has more than one. Because of the prevalence of this practice, this name is usually not the person's most called name, as it does not serve as a unique identifier. Females are usually given at most two names.

Full name 

Unlike the practice in Western countries, or countries with predominant European influence, there is not one way of writing a full name in Pakistan. The most popular convention is to append the most called given name of the father to the person's given names. Often, if the person has more than one given name, his full name consists only of his given names. Another convention is to prefix the person's given name with a title, which is usually associated with his tribal ancestry. Due to western influence, appending rather than prefixing titles to given names has become more common. One notable exception is the title Khan, common in people of Pashtun origin, which has always been appended rather than prefixed to given names. There are several titles used in Pakistan and other Muslim countries. Syed, Shaikh, Khawaja, Pasha, Mirza etc. are common. Less commonly, the tribal name itself is appended to the person's given names.

For females, tribal names or titles rarely figure in the person's full name although it has become more common due to Western influence. Instead her full name would be composed of her given names only, or if given only one name, her given name appended with her father's most called name. After marriage, the full name would be her most called name appended with her husband's most called name.

In official documents, a person's identity is established by listing both the person's full name (however they may write it), and their father's. For married women, the husband's name might be used instead of the father's. Official forms always contain fields for both names, and they are used together as A son/daughter/wife of B on ID cards, passports, diplomas, in court, etc.

The problem with these naming conventions is that it is difficult to trace back family roots. Many Muslims have settled in the Western world and this naming convention creates some problems as a father will have a different surname or family name from his children.

See also 
 List of Pakistani family names
 Honorifics in Pakistan

External links
 Searchable database of Muslim Baby Names
 Pakistani baby names

 
 
Names by culture